PICIC Commercial Bank Limited was a Pakistani bank based in Karachi, Pakistan.

Pakistan Industrial Credit and Investment Corporation (PICIC) acquired it as Gulf Commercial Bank Limited in early 2001. The bank was renamed as PICIC Commercial Bank Limited.

In 2007, the bank and its operations were merged into NIB Bank.

History
PICIC Commercial Bank Limited was incorporated in 1993 as Schön Bank Limited and commenced its business on 4 April 1994, with a paid-up capital of PKR 500 Million.

In 1997, Al Ahlia Portfolio Securities Company, Sultanate of Oman acquired the major shareholding and changed the bank’s name to Gulf Commercial Bank Limited. In February 2001, the bank’s management again changed when Pakistan Industrial Credit and Investment Corporation acquired 60% controlling shares from Al-Ahlia and changed its name to PICIC Commercial Bank in May 2001.

At the time of takeover by PICIC in February 2001, the Bank had only 15 branches. It was the 6th largest bank in the country at one time. On December 31, 2007, the operations of PICIC Commercial Bank were merged with and into NIB Bank Limited.

Functions

Services
 Commercial Financing
 Home Financing
 Car Financing
industrial financing
 Home Financing
 Telebanking
 Mobile Banking
 Motorcycle Financing
 Islamic Banking
 Deposit & Saving Products

Internet banking
As technology advanced, PICIC Commercial Bank was set to use it and make the best of it. They introduced for its customers, Online Banking solutions. With that customers could access their accounts for deposits, withdrawals or inquiries from any branch nationwide it is most wide bank in today it is closed now.

Branches
PICIC had over one hundred and twenty branches in over forty four cities including the main cities and towns of Pakistan.

Board of directors
 Chief Executive Hilal Khan
 Mr. Afghan Badshah CEO chairman
 Mr. Ahsan Bashir
 Mr. KASHIF BASHIR
 Mr. Muhammad Ali Khoja
 Mr. Sulaiman Ahmed Saeed Al Hoqani 
 Mr. Kamal Afsar (*)
 Mr. Manzoor Ahmed (*)
 Mr. Waseem  Haqqie

(*) Subject to State Bank of Pakistan approval under review test

External links

 PICIC Commercial Bank
 Pakistan Industrial Credit and Investment Corporation  Official Site

Defunct banks of Pakistan
Companies based in Karachi
Banks established in 1993
Mergers and acquisitions of Pakistani companies
Pakistani companies established in 1993
Banks disestablished in 2007
Pakistani companies disestablished in 2007